Krailas Panyaroj (born June 25, 1994) is a Thai professional footballer who plays as a right-back for Thai League 3 club Songkhla.

References

External links
 

1994 births
Living people
Krailas Panyaroj
Association football defenders
Krailas Panyaroj
Krailas Panyaroj
Krailas Panyaroj